Oecanthus varicornis, the different-horned tree cricket, is a species of tree cricket in the family Gryllidae. It was described by Francis Walker in 1869 and is found in Central and North America.

References

 Capinera J.L, Scott R.D., Walker T.J. (2004). Field Guide to Grasshoppers, Katydids, and Crickets of the United States. Cornell University Press.
 Otte, Daniel (1994). "Crickets (Grylloidea)". Orthoptera Species File 1, 120.

Further reading

 

varicornis
Insects of Central America
Orthoptera of North America
Insects described in 1869
Taxa named by Francis Walker (entomologist)